Brett Lovett (born 20 May 1966) is a former Australian rules footballer who played for the Melbourne Football Club in the Australian Football League (AFL).  He also represented Victoria on six occasions.

Recruited from Inverloch, Lovett played at half back for the Demons from 1986 until 1997. After retiring, he went on to coach Frankston in the Victorian Football League (VFL) from 2003 to 2008.

Lovett was appointed coach of Sandringham, also a VFL side, in October 2010.

Sandringham and Lovett parted ways in October 2011 when Sandringham decided to return to a full-time coaching position.

Lovett was appointed coach of fellow VFL club, Casey on 14 November 2011.

Statistics

|- style="background-color: #EAEAEA"
! scope="row" style="text-align:center" | 1986
|
| 50 || 8 || 0 || 2 || 74 || 52 || 126 || 18 ||  || 0.0 || 0.3 || 9.3 || 6.5 || 15.8 || 2.3 || 
|- 
! scope="row" style="text-align:center" | 1987
|
| 17 || 16 || 1 || 3 || 161 || 79 || 240 || 63 || 17 || 0.1 || 0.2 || 10.1 || 4.9 || 15.0 || 3.9 || 1.1
|- style="background-color: #EAEAEA"
! scope="row" style="text-align:center" | 1988
|
| 17 || 26 || 2 || 3 || 288 || 183 || 471 || 122 || 35 || 0.1 || 0.1 || 11.1 || 7.0 || 18.1 || 4.7 || 1.3
|- 
! scope="row" style="text-align:center" | 1989
|
| 17 || 24 || 1 || 2 || 282 || 206 || 488 || 111 || 39 || 0.0 || 0.1 || 11.8 || 8.6 || 20.3 || 4.6 || 1.6
|- style="background-color: #EAEAEA"
! scope="row" style="text-align:center" | 1990
|
| 17 || 24 || 7 || 8 || 318 || 189 || 507 || 103 || 35 || 0.3 || 0.3 || 13.3 || 7.9 || 21.1 || 4.3 || 1.5
|- 
! scope="row" style="text-align:center" | 1991
|
| 17 || 24 || 4 || 3 || 258 || 175 || 433 || 95 || 48 || 0.2 || 0.1 || 10.8 || 7.3 || 18.0 || 4.0 || 2.0
|- style="background-color: #EAEAEA"
! scope="row" style="text-align:center" | 1992
|
| 17 || 20 || 4 || 4 || 245 || 129 || 374 || 70 || 28 || 0.2 || 0.2 || 12.3 || 6.5 || 18.7 || 3.5 || 1.4
|- 
! scope="row" style="text-align:center" | 1993
|
| 17 || 18 || 0 || 3 || 190 || 142 || 332 || 59 || 11 || 0.0 || 0.2 || 10.6 || 7.9 || 18.4 || 3.3 || 0.6
|- style="background-color: #EAEAEA"
! scope="row" style="text-align:center" | 1994
|
| 17 || 25 || 14 || 3 || 296 || 241 || 537 || 96 || 34 || 0.6 || 0.1 || 11.8 || 9.6 || 21.5 || 3.8 || 1.4
|- 
! scope="row" style="text-align:center" | 1995
|
| 17 || 12 || 2 || 2 || 126 || 75 || 201 || 38 || 16 || 0.2 || 0.2 || 10.5 || 6.3 || 16.8 || 3.2 || 1.3
|- style="background-color: #EAEAEA"
! scope="row" style="text-align:center" | 1996
|
| 17 || 20 || 9 || 6 || 180 || 212 || 392 || 86 || 22 || 0.5 || 0.3 || 9.0 || 10.6 || 19.6 || 4.3 || 1.1
|- 
! scope="row" style="text-align:center" | 1997
|
| 17 || 18 || 4 || 4 || 135 || 110 || 245 || 61 || 10 || 0.2 || 0.2 || 7.5 || 6.1 || 13.6 || 3.4 || 0.6
|- class="sortbottom"
! colspan=3| Career
! 235
! 48
! 43
! 2553
! 1793
! 4346
! 922
! 295
! 0.2
! 0.2
! 10.9
! 7.6
! 18.5
! 3.9
! 1.3
|}

References

External links
 

1966 births
Living people
Australian rules footballers from Victoria (Australia)
Melbourne Football Club players
Victorian State of Origin players
Sandringham Football Club coaches
Casey Demons coaches